Esfandiari (also Romanized as Esfandīārī and Esfandeyārī; also known as  Esfandīār and Esfandiyar) is a village in Liravi-ye Miyani Rural District, Imam Hassan District, Deylam County, Bushehr Province, Iran. At the 2006 census, its population was 25, in 6 families.

References 

Populated places in Deylam County